Neapolitan Republic can refer to two different rebellions of Naples and its neighbourhood against the king's rule:
 the Neapolitan Republic of 1647.
 the Neapolitan Republic of 1799.